Indira Gandhi Institute of Child Health is a premier organization promoting tertiary level Child Health Care services. It is government-run referral centre for children in Karnataka state, India and it is an autonomous body, registered under Karnataka Societies Registration Act 1960  functioning under the control of Ministry of Medical Education, Government of Karnataka. It is located in Jayanagar 1st Block, Bangalore.

The hospital has 475 beds with state of art Paediatric critical care (35 beds) and Neonatal Intensive Care Unit accredited as Level 3B by NNF, India (National Neonatology Forum) with a strength of 40 beds equipped with advanced ventilation and trained staff.

Indira Gandhi Institute of Child Health has a 24×7 fully functional pediatric emergency and critical care service supported by laboratory and blood-bank services. It is known for its excellent emergency care and is a renowned institute across South India with patients being referred from the neighborhood states of Andhra Pradesh, Tamil Nadu, and Telangana and it also attracts many patients from West Bengal and Bihar.

Indira Gandhi Institute Of Child Health, is the brainchild of Dr.D.G.Benakappa (B.C.Roy awardee) who completed his training in Paediatrics from USA and UK. On his return to Indian shores in the late 1960s, he found a disdainful lack of child health services and worked to improve it, while he worked under various capacities in Mysore, Bengaluru, and Hubli.

His dream of establishing a comprehensive child care hospital was realised after nearly two decades of struggle when he established, Benakappa Children's Trust Hospital, which he handed over to the Government of Karnataka, later to be named as Indira Gandhi Institute Of Child Health.

Established in 1991 and expanded in phases, Indira Gandhi Institute Of Child Health was a functional referral hospital by 1995. It has grown over the years as a Paediatric Multi Super-speciality tertiary care hospital.

IGICH now stands as an esteemed institute for postgraduate training in Paediatrics(MD/DCh) and its allied Super-speciality course (MCh-Pediatric Surgery). It also offers fellowship programmes in Pediatric Critical Care, Pediatric Endocrinology, Pediatric Genetics, Pediatric Neurology, Neonatal Intensive Care, Pediatric Dermatology, Pediatric Radiology, Pediatric Orthopedics, Pediatric Urology, Pediatric Anesthesiology and minimally invasive surgery.

Departments
Paediatric Intensive Care 
Neonatal Intensive Care
Paediatric Medicine
Paediatric Surgery
Paediatric Radiology
Paediatric Neurology
Paediatric Genetics
Paediatric ENT
Paediatric Endocrinology
Paediatric Dermatology
Paediatric Rheumatology
Paediatric Gastroenterology
Paediatric Nephrology
Paediatric Pulmonary Medicine
Paediatric Orthopaedics
Paediatric Dentistry
Paediatric Ophthalmology
Paediatric Anaesthesiology 
.

Functions
Provide comprehensive and quality care to Paediatric patients.
Training of candidates in the speciality of Paediatrics and in the super speciality of Paediatric Surgery.
Organize scientific meetings, seminars, symposium, workshops in Child Health.
To take up research programmes relating to diagnosis and treatment of Paediatric ailments.

References 

Hospitals in Bangalore
 
Hospitals established in 1991
1991 establishments in Karnataka